The Girl, the Gold Watch & Dynamite is a 1981 American made-for-television fantasy-comedy film starring Philip MacHale and Lee Purcell.  The film is a sequel to the 1980 telefilm The Girl, the Gold Watch & Everything which was an adaptation of the John D. MacDonald novel The Girl, the Gold Watch & Everything.
The Original Sequel title was going to be "The Girl, the Gold Watch, and Everything Else", but was eventually dropped for the punchier "....and Dynamite" to draw more of a distinction between the Original Movie and the Sequel.

Plot
A couple have a gold watch that has the power to stop time. Kirby Winter and his fiancée Bonnie Lee Beaumont try to save her family farm from a land developer.

Cast
 Lee Purcell as Bonnie Lee Beaumont
 Philip MacHale as Kirby Winter
 Burton Gilliam as Hoover Hess III
 Zohra Lampert as Wilma Farnham
 Jack Elam as Seth Beaumont
 Gary Lockwood as Sheriff Earl Baker
 Jerry Mathers as Deputy Henry Thomas Watts
 Richie Havens as Amos
 Barney Phillips as Old Farmer
 Lyle Alzado as Mamie
 Carol Lawrence as Sarah Ann Beaumont
 Tom Poston as Omar Krepps
 Larry Linville as Wesley Reins
 Morgan Fairchild as Stella Walker
 Gene Barry as Andrew Stovall

Reception
The film got 2.5 out of 5 on AllMovie.

References

External links

1981 television films
1981 films
1980s fantasy comedy films
American fantasy comedy films
American sequel films
Films directed by Hy Averback
Films scored by Bruce Broughton
Films based on works by John D. MacDonald
1980s English-language films
1980s American films